"Stoner" is a song by American rapper Young Thug. Released on February 4, 2014 as Young Thug's commercial debut single, the song is also featured on DJ Spinz's music compilation HPG 3 (2013). After gaining popularity, the song was made available through iTunes by Atlantic Records. The song is ranked as one of the 100 songs that defined the 2010s decade by Billboard.

Music video
The music video for "Stoner", directed by Be El Be, was premiered on May 10, 2014. It features cameo appearances by fellow Southern hip hop acts, such as Birdman, Migos, Peewee Longway, Young Scooter, DJ Drama and Fabo.

Track listing
 Digital single

Commercial performance
The song, which was produced by Dun Deal, peaked at number 47 on the US Billboard Hot 100 on the week of April 5, 2014. And at number 13 on the US Billboard Hot R&B/Hip-Hop Songs.

Charts

Weekly charts

Year-end charts

Certifications

References

External links

2013 songs
Young Thug songs
2014 debut singles
Songs written by Young Thug
Asylum Records singles
Atlantic Records singles
Songs about cannabis